Gambaquezonia is a genus of the spider family Salticidae (jumping spiders) with two species. It was first described in some detail by Barrion & Litsinger (1995) from the female holotype, the only known specimen at the time. Its general appearance was later redescribed by Murphy and Murphy (2000).

Species 

G. itimana is a long green jumping spider, similar and probably related to Orthrus and Asemonea. The female is 6 mm long. The carapace is pale yellow, with a black band surrounding the eyes and reaching to the rear margin. The yellow abdomen features some longitudinal grey stripes and a wide black band, followed by two lateral black spots. The legs are yellow, with dark stripes on some segments.  It was described from a single collected female found in rice fields of Luzon Island on the Philippines.

The female has several unusual morphological features, including a large number of ventral macrosetae on legs I and II, prominent sparse rows of elongate setae on the dorsum, a multi-cusped retromarginal tooth, and an epigynum, superficially this looks like a euophryine, but is quite different structurally.

The other species, G. curioi, was documented by Freudenschuss, Grabolle & Krehenwinkel in 2016, found in the Philippines.

Footnotes

References
  (2000): An Introduction to the Spiders of South East Asia. Malaysian Nature Society, Kuala Lumpur.
  (2007): The world spider catalog, version 8.0. American Museum of Natural History.

External links
 Salticidae.org: Diagnostic drawings

Salticidae
Arthropods of the Philippines
Salticidae genera
Spiders of Asia